Patrick Paul D'Souza (28 August 1928 16 October 2014) was a Roman Catholic bishop.

Ordained to the priesthood on 20 December 1953, D'Souza was named bishop of the Diocese of Banaras on 5 June 1970 and was ordained bishop on 8 August 1970. 

D'Souza retired on 24 February 2007.

Notes

1928 births
2014 deaths
21st-century Roman Catholic bishops in India
20th-century Roman Catholic bishops in India